Tholey Abbey in Tholey, in the district of Sankt Wendel in Saarland, is a Benedictine monastery dedicated to Saint Maurice. It is part of the Beuronese Congregation within the Benedictine Confederation.

History
As early as the 5th and 6th centuries a group of clerics had established themselves here in the Roman ruins. On the instructions of Magnerich, bishop of Trier from 566 to 600, these hermits formed themselves into monastic communities. One of the earliest of such communities, at the foot of the Schaumberg, is said to have had Saint Wendelin as its head, who is thus counted by tradition as the first abbot of Tholey.

The Benedictine history of Tholey is thought to have begun in about 750. At the end of the 15th century the abbey joined the Bursfelde Congregation.

In 1794 during the French Revolution the abbey was plundered and burnt down, and dissolved the same year. In 1798 the remaining buildings were auctioned off. In 1806 they became the property of the municipality, as the parish church and priest's house.

The present abbey was established by the Benedictines in 1949 and settled in 1950 by monks from St. Matthias' Abbey, Trier. The monks work in pastoral care and run the guesthouse and book shop. As of 2020, twelve monks from five nations reside in the monastery.

in 2008, with philanthropic support from Edmund and Ursula Meiser, the chapter house was renovated, and baroque-style pavilion was erected on the grounds of the abbey.

In 2020, the abbey installed stained glass windows created by German artists Gerhard Richter and Mahbuba Maqsoodi. Richter's three windows — with deep reds and blues prevailing on the two outer displays and the central one dominated by radiant gold — are more than 30 feet tall and made to a symmetrical design. Maqsoodi's 34 windows for the church feature figurative images portraying saints and scenes from the Bible.

Abbots since the re-establishment in 1949
 1949–1976 Dr. Petrus Borne
 1977–1981 Hrabanus Heddergott
 1982–1985 Athanasius Weber (Prior Administrator)
 1985–2007 Makarios Hebler
 2008–present Mauritius Choriol (until 2014 as Prior Administrator)

References

 Manfred, Peter, 2005. Der heilige Wendelin – Die Geschichte eines faszinierenden Lebens. Otzenhausen: Verlag Burr.

External links
  Website of Tholey Abbey

Benedictine monasteries in Germany
Buildings and structures in Sankt Wendel (district)
1st-millennium establishments in Europe
Irish monastic foundations in continental Europe
Churches in Saarland
Roman Catholic churches in Germany